Nettlecombe may refer to:

 Nettlecombe, Dorset
 Nettlecombe, Isle of Wight
 Nettlecombe, Somerset